Françoise de Veyrinas (4 September 1943 – 16 August 2008), born Gardey de Soos, was a French politician and Member of the European Parliament.

Biography
Elected to Toulouse representing the UDF and the UMP uninterrupted since 1983, she was première adjointe ( "First Assistant") to her town from 1995 until 2008 and vice-president of the Communauté d'agglomération du Grand Toulouse ( loosely, "Community of the Conurbation of Greater Toulouse").  She sat on the Regional Mid-Pyrénées Council and then the General Council of Haute-Garonne.  She was also a Member of the European Parliament after François Bayrou resigned.  A specialist in social issues, she was briefly (May–November 1995) Secrétaire d'État aux Quartiers en difficulté ( "Secretary of State for Quarters in Difficulty") in the first Juppé government.

Voted a member of the UDF-CDS in 1993, she then failed to be elected in the legislative elections of 2002 and 2007.  In 2008, though re-elected city councillor on the ticket of the outgoing mayor Jean-Luc Moudenc, she ended up in opposition to the new Socialist mayor, Pierre Cohen.

From May 2003 until her death, de Veyrinas was president of the Conseil national des missions locales ( "National Council of Local Missions").

She died on 16 August 2008 at age 64, after a battle with cancer.  She received many tributes and mayor Pierre Cohen came to her funeral.

Citizenship
Regional delegate to the Women of Midi-Pyrénées (1979–1982 and 1986–1989)
Head of Maintenance at home elderly in Haute-Garonne (1983–1986)
Chargée de mission for the Minister of Social Affairs, Health and City, Simone Veil (1994)

Political offices
Regional Council of Midi-Pyrénées (1986–1992)
General Counsel of the Canton of Toulouse XII (1992–2001)
Member for Haute-Garonne's 6th constituency from 1993 to 1995
Secretary of State for areas, with the Minister for Integration and the Fight against Exclusion in Alain Juppé's government in 1995
MEP 2002 to 2004
City Council of Toulouse in 1983 to 2008
Deputy Mayor of Toulouse from 1995 to 2008 (mandates of Dominique Baudis, Philippe Douste-Blazy and Jean-Luc Moudenc)

Honours
Officier de la Legion d'honneur, awarded Friday 9 February 2007
Officier de l'Ordre national du Mérite, awarded 31 December 2005

References
This page was translated from its equivalent in the French Wikipedia on 19 July 2009.

External links

 (automatically translated) — AFP, 18 August 2008
  Her blog
  Profile on the French National Assembly Site

1943 births
2008 deaths
Officers of the Ordre national du Mérite
Officiers of the Légion d'honneur
MEPs for France 1999–2004
20th-century women MEPs for France
21st-century women MEPs for France
People from Aude
Women government ministers of France